Britt Goodwin (born 24 April 1983) is a Norwegian-British Olympic handball player. She was born in Gjøvik.

She played for the British national team, and competed at the 2012 Summer Olympics in London.

In league handball she has played for  Gjøvik og Vardal HK (2002-2008), Toten HK (2008-2009), Fjellhammer IL (2009-2010) and Asker SK (2010-2011).

She works as a nurse at Akershus University Hospital. She was the winner of the 2005 season of the Swedish-Norwegian reality television show Big Brother.

References

External links
Britt Goodwin on Twitter

1983 births
Living people
Sportspeople from Gjøvik
Norwegian people of British descent
British female handball players
Norwegian female handball players
Big Brother (franchise) winners
Handball players at the 2012 Summer Olympics
Olympic handball players of Great Britain
Norwegian nurses